The Beaumont Municipal Transit System is the primary provider of mass transportation in Jefferson County, Texas. Ten routes are operated from Monday through Saturday. All routes terminate at the Dannebaum Station Transit Center.

Dannebaum Station Transit Center, located adjacent to the site of a historic railroad depot, was built in 2000 at the cost of $670,000.  It is located on Laurel Avenue and is bounded by Laurel on the south, Liberty on the north, Magnolia Avenue to the west, and Willow Street to the east at  geographic coordinates (across the street from the Jack Brooks Federal Building).

Routes
1 Magnolia
2 Parkdale
3 Calder
4 South 11th 
5 Pine
6 Refinery
7 South Park
8 Pear Orchard
9 Laurel
10 College St.

References

External links
Website

Bus transportation in Texas